Cellana toreuma is a species of limpet, a marine gastropod mollusk in the family Nacellidae.

Distribution
Mainly distributed in South Korea, Mainland China, Taiwan, Japan, Ryukyu and Vietnam.

Parasite
This species is the ectoparasitic host of Philoblenna tumida Ho, 1981。

Gallery

References

 Nakano T. & Ozawa T. (2007). Worldwide phylogeography of limpets of the order Patellogastropoda: molecular, morphological and paleontological evidence. Journal of Molluscan Studies 73(1): 79–99.

External links

Nacellidae
Gastropods described in 1855
Marine gastropods